Zangley Dukpa (born 2 February 1950) is a Bhutanese politician who has been a Bhutan Peace and Prosperity Party (DPT) member of the National Assembly of Bhutan from 2013 to 2018. He also served as Minister of Health of Bhutan.

He obtained a master's degree in education from the University of Bristol in 1983.

References

1950 births
Living people
Alumni of the University of Bristol
Bhutanese MNAs 2013–2018
21st-century Bhutanese politicians
Druk Phuensum Tshogpa politicians
Bhutanese politicians
Health ministers of Bhutan
Druk Phuensum Tshogpa MNAs